Les Paradis Artificiels (Artificial Paradises) is a book by French poet Charles Baudelaire, first published in 1860, about the state of being under the influence of opium and hashish. Baudelaire describes the effects of the drugs and discusses the way in which they could theoretically aid mankind in reaching an "ideal" world. The text was influenced by Thomas de Quincey's Confessions of an English Opium-Eater and Suspiria de Profundis.

Baudelaire analyzes the motivation of the addict, and the individual psychedelic experience of the user. His descriptions have foreshadowed other such work that emerged later in the 1960s regarding LSD.

See also
The Hasheesh Eater by Fitz Hugh Ludlow
 List of books about cannabis

References

External links
 Les Paradis artificiels—Full online downloadable text.

Works by Charles Baudelaire
Poems about drugs
French works about cannabis
Non-fiction books about cannabis